Vizela is a town and a municipality in Portugal. It may also refer to:

 Vizela River, a river in northern Portugal
 F.C. Vizela, a football club in Portugal
 Estádio do Futebol Clube de Vizela, a football stadium in Portugal